Chinatown Nights may refer to:

 Chinatown Nights (1929 film), an American film
 Chinatown Nights (1938 film), a British film